Saagaram Santham is a 1983 Indian Malayalam-language film, directed and produced by P. G. Vishwambharan. The film stars Mammootty, Nedumudi Venu and Shanthi Krishna . The film has musical score by M. B. Sreenivasan.

Cast
Mammootty as Anathan
Shanthi Krishna as Sreedevi
Nedumudi Venu as Raghavan
Sukumari as Marathakam
Sreenath as Dr. Madan Mohan
Ramu

Soundtrack
The music was composed by M. B. Sreenivasan and the lyrics were written by O. N. V. Kurup.

References

External links
 

1983 films
1980s Malayalam-language films
Films directed by P. G. Viswambharan